Merlin Entertainments Limited is a British entertainment company based at Poole in Dorset, England. It was listed on the London Stock Exchange until November 2019, when it was acquired by a consortium that includes Kirkbi A/S (the investment arm of the Christiansen family, which controls The Lego Group).

History
In December 1998, Nick Varney, Andrew Carr and the senior management team of Vardon Attractions (Vardon plc) completed a management buyout of the company to form Merlin Entertainments Group Ltd., with the backing of the private equity firm Apax Partners. Apax sold the company in 2004 to another financial investor, Hermes Private Equity.

In May 2005, the company was acquired from Hermes by a division of The Blackstone Group, which later started a major expansion. Over the years, Merlin acquired Gardaland, an Italian theme park, and The Tussauds Group. The company was first listed on the London Stock Exchange in 2013.

Legoland
When the Legoland theme park was up for sale, Varney wanted to buy it, but Hermes did not want to tie up more capital. After the sale of Merlin to Blackstone Group, the company negotiated to buy control of Legoland in 2005 for about £250 million, then merged it with Merlin. As part of the deal, Kirkbi A/S, the investment arm of LEGO's owners, took a share in Merlin Entertainments.

Tussauds
In May 2007, Blackstone purchased The Tussauds Group, owner of the Madame Tussauds wax museums, for US$1.9 billion. This company was merged with Merlin and has since been managed by Merlin. After the Tussauds acquisition, Dubai International Capital, the previous owner, received a 20% stake in the combined entity as well as £1.03bn in cash.

On 17 July 2007, as part of the financing for the Tussauds deal, the freeholds of Alton Towers, Thorpe Park, Warwick Castle and Madame Tussauds were sold to private investor Nick Leslau and his investment firm Prestbury, with a subsequent leaseback agreement. Although the attraction sites are owned by Leslau, they are operated by Merlin based on a renewable 35-year lease.

Florida
On 15 January 2010, Merlin Entertainments bought Cypress Gardens, a defunct theme park in Winter Haven, Florida.  It was reopened as Legoland Florida theme park.

Reports in early October 2017 indicated that Merlin Entertainments was considering a takeover of Sea World in Orlando, but on 11 October, the company said it was no longer involved in such discussions.

Australia and New Zealand 
In late 2010, it was announced that Merlin would purchase approximately A$116 million worth of entertainment attractions located in Australia and New Zealand from Village Roadshow Theme Parks and Attractions. The sale would include Sydney Aquarium, Sydney Wildlife World, Oceanworld Manly, Sydney Tower and the Koala Gallery in Australia, in addition to Kelly Tarlton's Underwater World in New Zealand. On 3 March 2011, the deal was finalised. This was followed by the $140 million acquisition of Living and Leisure Australia which owned several attractions in the Asia-Pacific region including UnderWater World, Melbourne Aquarium, Falls Creek Alpine Resort, Hotham Alpine Resort, Otway Fly, Illawarra Fly, Busan Aquarium and Siam Ocean World.

On 28 June 2013, Merlin Australia's Madame Tussauds in Sydney placed a wax figure of the former Prime Minister, Julia Gillard, into a mock queue of the unemployed at a Centrelink office in central Sydney. Deposed by the Australian Labor Party in the evening of 26 June, and replaced by Kevin Rudd, the publicity stunt drew wide attention and international criticism for the blatant disrespect it cast on, specifically, the first female prime minister of Australia.

Listing
Merlin had planned to go public in the early 2000s, but market turbulence postponed those plans. Instead, Blackstone sold 20% of the company to the private equity firm CVC Capital Partners, reducing Blackstone's holding to 34%. CVC acquired another 8% from the Dubai investment fund which is no longer involved with the company, giving it 28% in all. Kirkbi, a Danish family trust that owns LEGO, also increased its stake, emerging as the largest shareholder, with 36%. CVC paid a price that valued Merlin at £2.25 billion – more than six times what Merlin and Legoland together were worth when Blackstone acquired them five years earlier. Blackstone's investment was by that point worth more than three and a half times what it had paid.

On 8 November 2013, Merlin floated 30% of the company on the London Stock Exchange, valuing the private equity-backed company at almost £3.4bn.

In June 2019, the company's board agreed to recommend a takeover offer of £4.8 billion from a consortium consisting of Kirkbi A/S, CPP Investment Board and The Blackstone Group. The takeover was approved by the high court in November 2019.

eOne's multi-territory partnership with Merlin
On 5 December 2019, Entertainment One announced a new multi-territory partnership with Merlin that would open an interactive PJ Masks nautical-themed trail throughout the company's Sea Life aquariums worldwide starting in February 2020.

Further tying into the collaboration between Merlin and eOne, select episodes of PJ Masks season 4 will feature underwater adventures.

Properties

Resort theme parks

LEGOLAND parks

Midway attractions

Future locations

Former locations

Bus operation 
In February 2016, Merlin purchased a 15% shareholding in Big Bus Tours.

References

External links
 

 
Entertainment companies established in 1998
British companies established in 1998
Leisure companies of the United Kingdom
Companies based in Poole
Private equity portfolio companies
Amusement park companies
The Blackstone Group companies
CVC Capital Partners companies
Companies formerly listed on the London Stock Exchange
2005 mergers and acquisitions
2013 initial public offerings
2019 mergers and acquisitions